Aspasiola is a genus of beetles in the family Carabidae, containing the following species:

 Aspasiola insignis Chaudoir, 1877
 Aspasiola lemoides Bates, 1883
 Aspasiola rutilans Chaudoir, 1877
 Aspasiola scutellaris Chaudoir, 1877

References

Lebiinae